Eric Melvyn Broadbelt (born 8 December 1947) is a former international speedway rider from England and Great Britain.

Speedway career 
Broadbelt reached the final of the British Speedway Championship in 1981. He rode in the top tier of British Speedway from 1967–1986, riding for various clubs. He was capped by England 17 times and Great Britain 14 times.

References 

1947 births
Living people
British speedway riders
Belle Vue Aces riders
Boston Barracudas riders
Edinburgh Monarchs riders
Halifax Dukes riders
Long Eaton Invaders riders
Poole Pirates riders
Sheffield Tigers riders
Swindon Robins riders